Koulor is an arrondissement of Goudiry  in Tambacounda Region in Senegal.

References 

Arrondissements of Senegal